The Bronswik Affair is a 1978 Canadian short film, directed by Robert Awad and André Leduc for the National Film Board of Canada.

Summary
An animated mockumentary, the film satirizes advertising and marketing through the story of Bronswik, a fictional manufacturer of television sets which feature special technology designed to disable viewers' ability to resist advertising pitches, spawning a frenzied addiction to consumerism which leads to a political and social crisis.

Production
The film had a budget of $106,618.

Awards
 29th Canadian Film Awards, Toronto: Best Theatrical Short Film, 1978
 Chicago International Film Festival, Chicago: Silver Plaque, 1978 
 Linz International Short Film Festival, Linz: Third Prize, Most Humoristic Film, 1978
 International Festival of Short and Documentary Films, Lille: COLIOP Award (Comité Lillois d'opinion publique), 1978
 Yorkton Film Festival, Yorkton: Golden Sheaf Award, Best Humour Film,  1979
 New York International Film & Television Festival, New York: Bronze Medal, 1980
 Golden Gate International Film Festival, San Francisco: Certificate for Remarkable Direction, Short film for commercial distribution, 1979
 Melbourne Film Festival, Melbourne: Diploma of Merit, 1979
 Columbus International Film & Animation Festival, Columbus, Ohio: Chris Statuette, Commerce and Industry, 1980

See also
Media manipulation
Television studies
Product placement

References

Works cited

External links
 The Bronswik Affair at the National Film Board of Canada
 
 The Bronswik Affair on NFB's official YouTube channel

1978 films
1978 animated films
1978 short films
Canadian animated short films
Canadian mockumentary films
Best Theatrical Short Film Genie and Canadian Screen Award winners
National Film Board of Canada animated short films
Canadian political satire films
Films about advertising
Films about consumerism
Films about television
1970s English-language films
1970s Canadian films